Michael Lanigan may refer to:
Mick Lanigan, Irish politician
Mike Lanigan, American race team owner